Cora Olive Sutton Castle (May 10, 1880 – August 14, 1966) was an American educator, sociologist, author, and clubwoman based in San Francisco, California.

Early life and education
Cora Olive Sutton was born in Prior Lake, Minnesota, the daughter of Andrew Stewart Sutton and Harriet Snow Sutton. She earned a bachelor's degree at the University of Minnesota in 1905, and a master's degree in literature at the University of California.

A Statistical Study of Eminent Women and other work
Cora Sutton Castle earned her doctorate in the psychology department at Columbia University in 1913, with a dissertation titled A Statistical Study of Eminent Women, the title a direct reference to her advisor James McKeen Cattell's paper, "A Statistical Study of Eminent Men" (1903). In her version of the study, she asked, "Has innate inferiority been the reason for the small number of eminent women, or has civilization never yet allowed them an opportunity to develop their innate powers and possibilities?" Her dissertation was published as a book the next year, and is still read and cited as an early example of collective biography of women.

Castle served as president of the San Francisco City Federation of Women's Clubs from 1918 to 1920, and in that role helped establish the "New Outside Inn," to host visiting family members of servicemen being treated at the Letterman Army Hospital.

Castle survived a fatal shipwreck in China in 1926, while traveling.

Personal life
Cora Sutton married Harry Edward Castle, a surgeon, in 1910. They lived in the Fairmont Hotel in San Francisco for many years, while he served as the hotel doctor. Cora Sutton Castle was widowed in 1949 and died from cancer in 1966, aged 86 years.

References

1880 births
1966 deaths
American women psychologists
20th-century American psychologists
American women in World War I
People from San Francisco
People from Scott County, Minnesota
Clubwomen
20th-century American people